The Catskill Top 102 is a peak-bagging list of the top 102 mountains in the Catskill Mountains of New York in the United States. It includes the thirty-five 3500-footers of the Catskill Mountains.

References

Peak bagging in the United States